Lorino may refer to:
Lorino, Umbria, a place in Ferentillo, Italy
Lorino, Chukotka Autonomous Okrug, a rural locality in Chukotsky District of Chukotka Autonomous Okrug